Dorothy Dare (born Dorothy Herskind, August 6, 1911 – October 4, 1981) was an American actress and singer.

Early life
Dare was born in Philadelphia, Pennsylvania. As a child, she often sang in church and developed good vocability. She first appeared on stage at the age of seven.

Hollywood years
She began her singing and acting career in several of Ziegfeld's shows and then appeared in Vitaphone shorts. By 1934 she was under contract to Warner Bros. Studios and made her debut in Very Close Veins (1934). During the 1930s, she starred in a string of successful films such as Gold Diggers of 1935, Front Page Woman (1935), High Hat (1937), and Clothes and the Woman (1937). She sang such songs as "Red Headed and Blue" and "Yoo Hoo Hoo". By the late 1930s and early 1940s, Dare began to lose parts. In 1942, she made her final film appearance as Peggy in The Yanks Are Coming and in 1944 she sang her last musical number in Musical Movieland.

Later years
Dare left movies and moved to Orange County, California. She seldom granted interviews or wrote about her Hollywood years.

Death
Dare died in Newport Beach, California, on October 4, 1981, and was buried at Pacific View Memorial Park in Corona del Mar, California.

Filmography

Nearly Naked (1933 short)
Very Close Veins (1934 short)
Private Lessons (1934 short) .... Babs Henderson
The Winnah! (1934 short) .... Dorothy
Syncopated City (1934 hort) .... Hal's Assistant/The New Mayor
Happiness Ahead (1934) .... Josie
The St. Louis Kid (1934) .... Gracie Smith
Sweet Adeline (1934) .... Dot/Band Leader
Maybe It's Love (1935) .... Lila
Gold Diggers of 1935 .... Arline Davis
Springtime in Holland (1935 short)
Front Page Woman (1935) .... Mae LaRue
Romance of the West (1935 short)
High Hat (1937) .... Elanda Lee
Rose of Tralee (1937) .... Jean Hale
Clothes and the Woman (1937) .... Carol Dixon
Cut Out for Love (1937) .... Dorothy
The Yanks Are Coming (1942) .... Peggy
Musical Movieland (1944 short)

Stage appearances
The Only Girl (1934)
Strike Me Pink (1933)
Manhattan Vanities (1932)
Here Comes the Groom (1931)
America's Sweetheart (1931)

References

External links

1911 births
1981 deaths
20th-century American actresses
Actresses from Philadelphia
American film actresses
American stage actresses
Actors from Orange County, California
Burials at Pacific View Memorial Park
Traditional pop music singers
Ziegfeld girls
20th-century American singers
20th-century American women singers